Debbie Anne Ngarewa-Packer is a New Zealand politician, iwi leader and activist. She is a Member of Parliament and co-leader of Te Pāti Māori alongside Rawiri Waititi, and is the chief executive of the Ngāti Ruanui iwi. She stood for Te Pāti Māori during the 2020 election in the seat of Te Tai Hauāuru. While she failed to win the electorate, she was placed first on Te Pāti Māori list, where she won a list seat once the special votes were counted.

Early life 
Ngarewa-Packer grew up in Patea and attended New Plymouth Girls' High School.

Local government 
Ngarewa-Packer is a former deputy mayor of South Taranaki. She was elected to the South Taranaki District Council in the 2007 local elections, representing the Pātea ward. She also contested the mayoral position, which was won by Ross Dunlop; after the elections Dunlop selected her as deputy mayor. She held that role until 2010, when she did not seek re-election.

Ngāti Ruanui and local activism 
Ngarewa-Packer is chief executive of the Ngāti Ruanui iwi. She has also been the kaiarataki of Te Rūnanga o Ngāti Ruanui, an organisation that runs healthcare centres in Hāwera and Patea. She has advocated for Māori health and the environment at a grassroots level for many years. In 2004, she rallied more than 250 Taranaki people to join with the foreshore and seabed hikoi on its way to Wellington.

Ngarewa-Packer campaigned against seabed mining off the Taranaki coast. The Environmental Protection Authority granted a marine discharge consent to mining company Trans-Tasman Resources (TTR) in 2017, but a later High Court decision cancelled these consents. In April 2020, the Court of Appeal found that EPA's 2017 decision was not consistent with the law to protect the environment from harmful substances. TTR appealed to the Supreme Court, to which Ngarewa-Packer said "We’re annoyed that we may have to go to court for a fourth time as right now our efforts are focused on protecting our community from Covid-19. But we are undeterred in our resolve and we will oppose TTR’s application for yet another appeal." The Supreme Court's final decision supported the earlier courts in cancelling the consents.

In 2011, she joined a 10-member independent panel set up by the Government to identify ways to raise the rate of return on Maori-owned assets, and grow Maori contribution to New Zealand's economy.

Regarding the Covid-19 response, The Spinoff described Ngarewa-Packer in 2020 as "a key voice in the Covid-19 iwi response, not only in analysing and mitigating risks in her own rohe, but in keeping applied pressure on local and central government to include Māori in their risk assessment."

Parliamentary career

Election to parliament 
Debbie Ngarewa-Packer "put her hand up" to be the Māori Party's candidate for the Te Tai Hauāuru electorate for the 2017 election, saying she had been approached by party co-leader Tariana Turia and that she had "supported the Maori Party from day one". However, the party's candidate for this electorate was ultimately Howie Tamati.

Ngarewa-Packer was selected in October 2019 to be the Māori Party's candidate for the Te Tai Hauāuru electorate for the 2020 election – the first electoral candidate announced by the party for that election – and in April 2020 was elected unopposed to be co-leader of the Māori Party, along with John Tamihere. Ngarewa-Packer and Tamihere were the first party leaders elected since the Māori Party lost its parliament seats in the 2017 election, after which its previous leaders stepped down. Ngarewa-Packer had the party's number one list position for the election.

Ngarewa-Packer was generally considered to be the Māori Party's best chance at returning to Parliament; polls showed the party below the 5 per cent party vote threshold, so it would need to win at least one electorate seat to enter. A poll released in late September 2020 showed Labour's candidate for Te Tai Hauāuru, Adrian Rurawhe, as having greater support than Ngarewa-Packer, though there were a large number of undecided voters in the poll. In response to the poll, Ngarewa-Packer said she was buoyed by the number of undecided voters and called the electorate “winnable”. During the campaign, she stated a need for Māori-led approaches to problems faced by Māori such as worse health and housing, and that the Māori Party would hold the government to account.

At the 2020 election, Ngarewa-Packer was elected as a Member of Parliament. She came second in the Te Tai Hauāuru electorate, receiving 11,107 electorate votes to Rurawhe's 12,160, but fellow Te Pāti Māori co-leader Rawiri Waititi unseated Labour MP Tāmati Coffey in the Waiariki electorate. Waititi's electorate win meant that the Māori Party was entitled to enter Parliament and to bring additional MPs if its party vote was high enough. The initial count suggested the party had won 1.0% of the party vote – only enough for one seat – but the final count showed the party had received 1.2% and was entitled to a second seat. Since the Māori party constitution states that co-leaders must be first drawn from its parliamentary caucus, Waititi replaced Tamihere as Ngarewa-Packer's co-leader.

Actions as an MP

Covid-19 
Ngarewa-Packer has called upon the Government to "get out of the way" and instead let Māori fix lagging Covid-19 vaccination rates. She and a team of volunteers spearheaded a mobile program to lift Covid vaccination rates in South Taranaki for "yaks and vax" sessions. These included door-to-door services, and were overseen by a registered nurse provided by Taranaki District Health Board. Ngarewa-Packer became trained in delivering vaccinations. The initiative followed low vaccination rates for Taranaki Māori; vaccination rates later rose for this population which Ngarewa-Packer attributed to Māori-led work, saying "We’ve borrowed the Māori Party campervan, and we’ve been hitting the streets doing it our way... There’s a lot of fear. They’re not anti-vax, just scared. And we have to respect that." At one event Niel Packer, Debbie Ngarewa-Packer's husband, was punched in the face by a man angry at the vaccination program.

In August 2021, she called for "serious consequences" for those breaking lockdown, saying that New Zealand "[does] not have the health capacity to deal with Delta".

Ngarewa-Packer condemned a plan to gradually ease lockdown restrictions in Auckland that was announced in October 2021. She noted at the time that only 56 percent of eligible Māori had received any Covid vaccination compared to 79 percent of all eligible people in New Zealand, and said the plan showed “Māori were always expendable” and that "this was never a [vaccination] strategy designed to include tangata whenua".

Seabed mining 
Ngarewa-Packer submitted a member's bill in early 2021 which would ban seabed mining in New Zealand waters. This followed her eight-year work with her iwi campaigning against seabed mining in their region. The Green Party has supported the Bill. To be introduced to parliament, the bill would need the support of 61 non-Minister MPs or be drawn from a random ballot.

Racism and te ao Māori 
Ngarewa-Packer criticised the National Party's "Demand The Debate" campaign, saying it fuelled racism. "They knew exactly what they were doing when they started this latest campaign,” she said, "I can tell you the day, the hour, the minute it went from being 18 threats a week to 30 to 40 a night. It was after National started criticising the Māori health authority, and then the He Puapua report.” She noted cases of harassment and death threats from far-right activists to Māori women, which had been escalating, and has called for a joint task force to investigate anti-Māori hate speech.

Ngarewa-Packer has called for place names in Taranaki to be reverted to their original te reo Māori names, and the Māori Party presented a petition to parliament calling for New Zealand's official name to be Aotearoa. She said that "Our reo is the gateway to stopping racism."

Actions in Parliament 
After the 2020 election, Ngarewa-Packer became the Māori Party's parliamentary whip, or Mataura. On 26 November 2020, Ngarewa-Packer and Waititi walked out of Parliament after the Speaker of the House Trevor Mallard declined Waititi's motion that the Māori Party be allowed to speak for 15 minutes because MPs from smaller parties were not scheduled to deliver their maiden speeches until the following week. Ngarewa-Packer criticised Mallard's decision as "another example of the Māori voice being silenced and ignored." Writing in December 2020, journalist Marc Daalder said, "Waititi and Ngarewa-Packer have already garnered a reputation for – depending on who you ask – rabble-rousing, troublemaking or standing up for their rights."

Other work 
In a 2021 interview, Ngarewa-Packer said her goals included helping whānau access safe housing, along with achieving better incomes and health outcomes.

Personal 
Ngarewa-Packer is of Ngāti Ruahine, Ngāruahine, and Ngā Rauru iwi. She is a descendant of Tutange Waionui of Ngati Ruanui, who fought alongside Titokowaru during the New Zealand Wars and claimed credit for killing Prussian mercenary Gustavus von Tempsky. Ngarewa-Packer was a nominee for the Taranaki Daily News person of the year in 2018.

References 

|-

Living people
Māori Party politicians
Deputy mayors of places in New Zealand
Māori Party co-leaders
New Zealand activists
New Zealand women activists
Ngāti Ruanui people
New Zealand Māori women
21st-century New Zealand politicians
21st-century New Zealand women politicians
Date of birth missing (living people)
Candidates in the 2020 New Zealand general election
Year of birth missing (living people)
People educated at New Plymouth Girls' High School
People from Patea